This is a list of episodes for the television series Police Woman.

Series overview

Episodes

Pilot (1974)
The pilot for this series was an episode of Police Story titled "The Gamble" (March 26, 1974), in which Angie Dickinson was introduced as a vice officer named Lisa Beaumont.

Season 1 (1974–75)

Season 2 (1975–76)

Season 3 (1976–77)

Season 4 (1977–78)

References
 
 

Police Woman